Ion Teodorescu (born 27 July 1976 in Bucharest) is a Romanian rugby union player. He plays as a wing.

He played in France for SU Agen and in Romania for Contor Arad.

Teodorescu had 39 caps for Romania, from 2001 to 2007, scoring 13 tries, 65 points in aggregate. He played four matches at the 2003 Rugby World Cup, scoring a try. He was selected for the 2007 Rugby World Cup but was never used. Teodorescu has been absent from his national team since then.

External links
Ion Teodorescu International Statistics

1976 births
Living people
Romanian rugby union players
Rugby union wings
Rugby union players from Bucharest
Romania international rugby union players
Romanian expatriate rugby union players
Expatriate rugby union players in France
Romanian expatriate sportspeople in France
SU Agen Lot-et-Garonne players